Ljubiša Stanković (born June 1, 1960) is a doctor in signal processing,  while also being the former Rector (2003-2008) and University Board President (2008-2011) for the University of Montenegro. Since March 27, 2011 he is also the Ambassador of Montenegro to the United Kingdom. 

Stanković was born in Andrijevica, Montenegro.  In 2011, he was elected to the European Academy of Arts and Sciences. In 2012, he was elected a member of Academia Europaea.

References

1960 births
Living people
Montenegrin diplomats
Social Democratic Party of Montenegro politicians
Union of Reform Forces of Yugoslavia politicians
Fellow Members of the IEEE
Members of Academia Europaea